Shane Hair (born 24 October 1975) is an Australian male former track and field athlete who competed in the long jump. He is a four-time national champion in the long jump, having won three straight titles from 1997 to 1999 and his last in 2004. He ranked fourth at the 1998 Commonwealth Games and was fifth at the 1999 World Championships in Athletics with a jump of  – a career best that ranked him ninth in the world for that season. From Western Australia, he also represented his country at the 1994 World Junior Championships in Athletics.

International competitions

National titles
Australian Athletics Championships
Long jump: 1997, 1998, 1999, 2004

See also
List of Australian athletics champions (men)

References

External links

Living people
1975 births
Sportsmen from Western Australia
Australian male long jumpers
World Athletics Championships athletes for Australia
Athletes (track and field) at the 1998 Commonwealth Games
Commonwealth Games competitors for Australia
20th-century Australian people
21st-century Australian people